Lieutenant Eugene Hoy Barksdale (November 5, 1896 – August 11, 1926) was a noted aviator and was a First Lieutenant in the United States Army Air Service and Army Air Corps. The new Barksdale Field (now Barksdale Air Force Base) in Bossier City/Shreveport, Louisiana, was named for him on

Early years
Born in Goshen Springs, Mississippi, Barksdale had one brother and five sisters. He attended Mississippi State College in Starkville for three years before leaving to enter officers training camp at Fort Logan H. Roots in Little Rock, Arkansas. He volunteered for the aviation section of the U.S. Army Signal Corps as a Private First Class.

Life and career
Barksdale completed aviation ground school in Austin, Texas. In September 1917, he embarked to England and received flight training with the Royal Flying Corps and was assigned to the 41st Squadron, Royal Flying Corps, in 1918. He later became a founding member of the U.S. Army's 25th Aero Squadron. In 1919, Barksdale was assigned to Mitchel Field, New York, where he married Lura Lee Dunn in 1921. On 8 March 1924 then Lt Barksdale and his navigator, Lt Bradley Jones, flew a DH-4B, powered by a 400-horsepower Liberty engine from McCook Field, OH to Mitchel Field using instruments only.

Death
Barksdale was testing a Douglas O-2 observation airplane for spin characteristics over McCook Field in Dayton, Ohio, and did not recover from a flat spin. While parachuting out of the plane, his parachute caught in the wing's brace wires, and he went down with the plane. He was buried with full military honors in Arlington National Cemetery in Arlington, Virginia.

See also

 25th Aero Squadron
 Reed G. Landis
 Frederick Ernest Luff

References

External links

 Barksdale Air Force Base – the base provides information about its dedication to its namesake
 

1896 births
1926 deaths
Aviators killed in aviation accidents or incidents in the United States
Burials at Arlington National Cemetery
United States Army officers
United States Army Air Service pilots of World War I
Victims of aviation accidents or incidents in 1926